Adrianus or Adriaan van Meerbeeck (1563–1627) was a writer and translator from Antwerp.

Life
Meerbeeck was born in Antwerp in 1563. By 1600 he was headmaster of the Aalst grammar school, and he was still living in Aalst in 1625. He is best known for two chronicles,  (1620) and Nederlantschen Mercurius (1625), and also for compiling accounts of the funerals of Ferdinand II of Aragon, Emperor Charles V, Philip II of Spain, Rudolph II, Philip III of Spain and Albert VII, Archduke of Austria.

His brother, Jan van Meerbeeck, was a printer in Brussels.

Works

Histories
 (Antwerp, Hieronymus Verdussen, 1620). Available on Google Books.
 (Brussels, Ferdinand de Hoeymaker, 1622). Available on Google Books.
 (Brussels, Ferdinand de Hoeymaker, 1622). Available on Google Books.
 (Brussels, Jan van Meerbeeck, 1625). Available on Google Books.
, drawn from the works of Josephus and Hegesippus; surviving only in a reprint from 1711. Available on Google Books.

Translations
Nicolas de Montmorency,  (Antwerp, Caesar Joachim Trognaesius, 1617). Reprinted Leuven, 1690.
Johannes Cotovicus,  (Antwerp, Hieronymus Verdussen, 1620).

References

1563 births
1627 deaths
Writers from Antwerp
17th-century historians from the Holy Roman Empire
Latin–Dutch translators
French–Dutch translators